Constant Reformation was a 42-gun great ship of the English navy, built by William Burrell at Deptford and launched in 1619. It first saw action in the English expedition to Algiers (1620–1621), then in the unsuccessful Cádiz expedition (1625), part of the Anglo-Spanish War (1625–1630).

In the First English Civil War from 1642 to 1646, Constant Reformation was the flagship of the Parliamentarian deputy commander Vice-Admiral William Batten, before being taken over by Thomas Rainsborough when he was appointed commander in January 1648. His crew mutinied in May 1648 and with Batten acting as captain, the Constant Reformation was one of the ships that defected to the Royalists during the Second English Civil War in August 1648. While acting as a Royalist privateer, it ran aground near Terceira Island in the Azores and was lost in 1651.

Notes

References

Sources

Lavery, Brian (2003) The Ship of the Line - Volume 1: The development of the battlefleet 1650-1850. Conway Maritime Press. .

Ships of the English navy
Ships built in Deptford
1610s ships